The 2019–20 season was Željezničar's 99th in existence and their 20th season in the Premier League BH. Besides competing in the Premier League, the team also competed in the National Cup.

In that season, the league ended abruptly on 1 June 2020 due to the COVID-19 pandemic in Bosnia and Herzegovina and by default Željezničar finished in second place, qualifying to the 2020–21 UEFA Europa League qualifying rounds.

Season review

June
On 13 June, Željezničar announced the signing of 24-year-old Filip Erić.

On 18 June, Željezničar and Ermin Zec negotiated a three-year contract extension lasting until June 2022.

On 20 June, Željezničar announced the signing of 31-year-old Mehmed Alispahić.

On 24 June, Željezničar and Siniša Stevanović negotiated a two-year contract extension lasting until May 2021.

On 25 June, Željezničar announced the signing of 18-year-old Amar Mehić from Zvijezda Gradačac.

On 26 June, Željezničar and Milkos extended their sponsorship agreement.

On 27 June, Željezničar signed a sponsorship agreement with Tondach Wienerbeger and Sarajevo Business Consulting.

On 27 June, Željezničar announced the signing of 21-year-old Petar Bojo from Mladost Doboj Kakanj.

On 28 June, Željezničar and General Logistic extended their partnership agreement.

On 29 June, the club announced Admir Džubur as the new Chairman of the club.

July
On 1 July, Željezničar and Proteam signed a partnership agreement.

On 2 July, Željezničar and Porsche BH extended their sponsorship agreement.

On 8 July, Željezničar announced the signing of 18-year-old Sedad Subašić from Rudar Kakanj.

On 13 July, Željezničar and BBI Banka extended their sponsorship agreement.

On 15 July, Željezničar and Perugia completed the transfer of Matej Rodin.

On 17 July, Željezničar and Admiral Casino extended their sponsorship agreement.

On 17 July, the club announced new home kit for the upcoming season. Following day, the club announced new away kit.

On 18 July, the club announced six players will leave on loan to various clubs in the First League of FBiH.

On 19 July, Željezničar and Sarajevo osiguranje extended their sponsorship agreement.

On 23 July, Željezničar extended their sponsorship agreement with Amko komerc and Farmavita.

On 30 July, Željezničar and Rail Cargo Logistics – BH osiguranje extended their sponsorship agreement.

August
On 2 August, Željezničar announced the signing of 31-year-old Semir Štilić.

October
On 18 October, Željezničar signed a sponsorship agreement with Imtec.

On 22 October, Željezničar signed a sponsorship agreement with Franck.

On 24 October, Željezničar signed a sponsorship agreement with Exclusive Change (EXC).

On 25 October, Željezničar extended their sponsorship agreement with Sarajevski kiseljak.

On 29 October, the club announced that the construction of the south stand of the Grbavica Stadium is scheduled to begin in September 2020 and due to end in September 2021.

December
On 10 December, Željezničar extended their sponsorship agreement with Eurofarm.

On 11 December, Željezničar extended their sponsorship agreement with Svjetlostkomerc.

On 12 December, Željezničar extended their sponsorship agreement with Vitinka.

On 12 December, Željezničar signed a sponsorship agreement with BH Passport.

On 17 December, Željezničar and Umm Salal completed the transfer of Enes Sipović.

On 20 December, Željezničar signed a 5 year sponsorship agreement with Italian sportswear company Macron.

January
On 3 January, Željezničar and Suwon Samsung Bluewings completed the transfer of Sulejman Krpić.

On 7 January, Željezničar announced the signing of 28-year-old Ivan Lendrić.

On 12 January, Željezničar announced Haris Hajdarević will be leaving on loan to Sloboda Tuzla.

On 14 January, Željezničar announced the signing of 30-year-old Aleksandar Jovanović.

On 30 January, Željezničar announced the signing of 33-year-old Aleksandar Kosorić.

On 30 January, Željezničar and Mladen Veselinović negotiated a two-and-a-half-year contract extension lasting until June 2022.

February
On 1 February, Željezničar announced the signing of 25-year-old Frane Ikić.

On 14 February, Željezničar announced the signings of 33-year-old Nermin Jamak and 25-year-old Luka Miletić.

On 20 February, Željezničar extended their sponsorship agreement with Unigradnja d.d. and with Proteam.

On 21 February, Željezničar extended their sponsorship agreement with Deny-Prom and with NEBI.

On 27 February, Željezničar announced the signing of 19-year-old Edin Mujić.

On 28 February, Željezničar extended their sponsorship agreement with Lutrija BiH.

March
On 11 March, Željezničar extended their sponsorship agreement with Nexe beton d.o.o.

On 13 March, Željezničar extended their sponsorship agreement with Telemach.

On 17 March, Željezničar extended their sponsorship agreement with NLB Banka.

On 30 March, Željezničar signed a sponsorship agreement with Central Osiguranje d.d.

On 31 March, Željezničar extended their sponsorship agreement with HOŠE Komerc.

May
On 18 May, Željezničar signed a sponsorship agreement with Mliječna industrija 99.

On 20 May, Željezničar extended their sponsorship agreement with General Logistic.

On 21 May, Željezničar extended their sponsorship agreement with In Time.

Squad information

Players

Disciplinary record
Includes all competitive matches and only players that got booked throughout the season. The list is sorted by shirt number, and then position.

Squad statistics

Goalscorers

Last updated: 8 March 2020

Assists

Last updated: 8 March 2020

Clean sheets

Last updated: 8 March 2020

Transfers

Players in 

Total expenditure:  €30.000

Players out 

Total income:  €600,000
Net:  €570,000

Club

Coaching staff
{|
|valign="top"|

Other information

Sponsorship

|-

Competitions

Pre-season

Mid-season

Overall

Premijer Liga BiH

League table

Results summary

Results by round

Matches

Kup BiH

Round of 32

Round of 16

Quarter-finals

References

FK Željezničar Sarajevo seasons
Zeljeznicar